Southwest Petroleum University is a station on Line 3 of the Chengdu Metro in China. It serves the nearby Southwest Petroleum University Chengdu Campus.

Station layout

Gallery

References

Railway stations in Sichuan
Railway stations in China opened in 2018
Chengdu Metro stations